Amblymoropsis papuana is a species of beetle in the family Cerambycidae. It was described by Stephan von Breuning (entomologist) in 1961.

References

Desmiphorini
Beetles described in 1961